William Pete Cunningham (November 7, 1929 – December 21, 2010) was a  Democratic member of the North Carolina General Assembly representing the 107th House district, including constituents in Mecklenburg county. He resigned on December 31, 2007, in his 11th term.

Cunningham worked with Robert F. Williams and the Monroe County chapter of the NAACP in the 1950s and 1960s. He served in the US Navy, (Ret.) for 16 years, (Submarine) US Army Paratrooper for 4 years. He was also a real estate investor in Charlotte, North Carolina.

Electoral history

2006

2004

2002

2000

References

External links
Follow the Money - W. Pete Cunningham
2006 2004 2002 2000 1998 1996 campaign contributions

|-

1929 births
2010 deaths
People from Union County, North Carolina
People from Charlotte, North Carolina
Politicians from Charlotte, North Carolina
United States Army soldiers
United States Navy sailors
20th-century American politicians
21st-century American politicians
20th-century African-American politicians
African-American men in politics
21st-century African-American politicians
African-American state legislators in North Carolina
Democratic Party members of the North Carolina House of Representatives